The canton of Sélestat is an administrative division of the Bas-Rhin department, northeastern France. Its borders were modified at the French canton reorganisation which came into effect in March 2015. Its seat is in Sélestat.

It consists of the following communes:

Artolsheim
Baldenheim
Bindernheim
Bœsenbiesen
Bootzheim
Châtenois
Dieffenthal
Ebersheim
Ebersmunster
Elsenheim
Heidolsheim
Hessenheim
Hilsenheim
Kintzheim
Mackenheim
Marckolsheim
Mussig
Muttersholtz
Ohnenheim
Orschwiller
Richtolsheim
Saasenheim
Scherwiller
Schœnau
Schwobsheim
Sélestat
Sundhouse
La Vancelle
Wittisheim

References

Cantons of Bas-Rhin